Oiba is a town and municipality in the Santander Department in northeastern Colombia. Its antipode   Oiba borders Guapotá  and Confines in the north; Charalá in the east; Guadalupe and Guapotá in the west; and Suaita in the south.

History 
In the time before the Spanish conquest of the Muisca, Oiba was inhabited by the Guane. The modern town was conquered and founded on February 28, 1540, by Martín Galeano.

Economy 
Oiba is an agricultural community that cultivates mainly coffee, sugarcane, maize, yuca and tree tomatoes.

References

External links 

Municipalities of Santander Department
Populated places established in 1540
1540 establishments in the Spanish Empire